Djeidi Gassama (born 10 September 2003) is a professional footballer who plays as a winger for Belgian First Division A club Eupen, on loan from Ligue 1 club Paris Saint-Germain. Born in Mauritania, he represents France at youth international level.

Career
A former youth academy player of Brest, Gassama joined Paris Saint-Germain (PSG) in 2019. He signed his first professional contract with the club in July 2020. On 14 May 2022, he made his professional debut in a 4–0 league win against Montpellier.

On 6 September 2022, Gassama joined Belgian club Eupen on a season-long loan deal.

Career statistics

Honours

Paris Saint-Germain

Ligue 1: 2021–22

References

External links
 
 

2003 births
Living people
French sportspeople of Mauritanian descent
Black French sportspeople
Association football forwards
Mauritanian footballers
French footballers
France youth international footballers
Championnat National 3 players
Ligue 1 players
Belgian Pro League players
AS Poissy players
FC Mantois 78 players
Stade Brestois 29 players
Paris Saint-Germain F.C. players
K.A.S. Eupen players
Mauritanian expatriate footballers
Mauritanian expatriate sportspeople in Belgium
Expatriate footballers in Belgium